The 1940 Ohio Bobcats football team was an American football team that represented Ohio University as an independent during the 1940 college football season. In their 17th season under head coach Don Peden, the Bobcats compiled a 5–2–2 record and outscored opponents by a total of 89 to 32.

Schedule

References

Ohio
Ohio Bobcats football seasons
Ohio Bobcats football